The 2006 congressional elections in Indiana were elections for Indiana's delegation to the United States House of Representatives, which occurred along with congressional elections nationwide on November 7, 2006. Indiana played an important role in helping Democrats sweep Congress, when three Republican incumbents were defeated: (Chris Chocola, John Hostettler and Mike Sodrel), giving the Democrats a majority of the delegation again. Republicans held a majority of Indiana's delegation, 7–2, before the elections.

Overview

District 1

This district is located in Northwest Indiana and borders Chicago. The district has been one of the most Democratic in Indiana.

District 2

This district is centered on South Bend and the Indiana portion of the Michiana region.

Chocola defeated Tony Zirkle, an attorney, Navy veteran, and frequent candidate, in the Republican primary on May 2, 2006, by 70% to 30%. Zirkle, who said he was "willing to debate the idea of returning the guillotine and lynch mob for those who prey on children under the age of 12", was unable to get Chocola to debate him on that or any other subject.

Donnelly raised about $1.5 million to Chocola's $3.2 million. In mid-August, in a report on National Republican Congressional Committee planned spending, the Associated Press reported that "the GOP has not reserved advertising time to aid Rep. Chris Chocola in Indiana even though Democrats plan to spend at least $700,000 to win the district. House Republicans have told Chocola that he must fend for himself, given his personal wealth and his ability to raise large amounts of money."

A poll released in mid-June by the Donnelly campaign showed Donnelly leading 48% to 38% with 14% undecided. The campaign did not release all of the poll findings. A poll released six days later, taken by the South Bend Tribune, showed the race to be at the margin of error with Donnelly at 46% and Chocola at 41%. The telephone poll interviewed 400 likely voters who were asked whom they would vote for "if the election were held now".

On August 16, the Cook Political Report changed the rating for the race from "Lean Republican" to "Toss-Up", saying "Despite a significant fundraising advantage over Democrat Joe Donnelly, which has helped fuel a barrage of negative attack ads, incumbent GOP Rep. Chris Chocola looks more like an underdog than the frontrunner." Also in August 2006, Larry Sabato's Crystal Ball, a Web site run by the University of Virginia Center for Politics, added the race to their "Ferocious Forty" list of the 40 most competitive House races in the nation.

On November 7, 2006, Chocola lost his congressional seat to Democratic candidate Joe Donnelly, whom Chocola had defeated in 2004. The final tally showed Chocola losing by a 54–46 margin, almost an identical reversal of his fortunes in 2004. The election had a much lower turnout than the previous campaign, and the difference appeared to come in St. Joseph County. Historically a Democratic stronghold, Chocola lost it by only a few hundred votes while cruising to victory in 2004. In 2006, however, Donnelly won the county by nearly 14,000 votes, garnering 58% of the vote in what is by far the most populous county of the district.

District 3

This district is located in the northeast corner of Indiana and has a large population center in Fort Wayne.

District 4

This district is located in west-central Indiana. Located within the district is the city of West Lafayette and the western suburbs of Indianapolis.

District 5

This district located mostly north of Indianapolis, including the largest suburbs of Indianapolis in Hamilton County.

District 6

This district takes in a large portion of eastern Indiana, including the cities of Muncie, Anderson, and Richmond.

District 7

This election pitted five-term incumbent Democrat Julia Carson against Republican Eric Dickerson.

Automobile dealer Eric Dickerson is a native of Detroit, Michigan and a graduate of Western Michigan University where he received his B.S. in engineering. Dickerson is a former U.S. Marine Corps officer and served with the HMA 269 Attack Squadron in Jacksonville, North Carolina. He later served in the Indiana National Guard.

Julia Carson had held this Congressional seat based in urban Indianapolis since 1997, and had always won by comfortable margins.  Republicans hoped to take the seat in the 2006 elections after redistricting made the 7th slightly more Republican, though Democrats still held the advantage.

Dickerson ran an aggressive grass-roots campaign, defeating the party-endorsed candidate, Ronald Franklin, and two other candidates in the Republican primary on May 2, 2006. He gained further support as the campaign progressed, with an October poll shocking observers of both parties when it showed Dickerson narrowly leading Carson 45% to 42%. Carson dismissed the poll, saying that she always polled more strongly than expected on election day. She was proven correct, winning her sixth term on November 7, 2006.

This district is in the heart of Central Indiana and encompasses most of Marion County/Indianapolis.

District 8

Population centers of Evansville and Terre Haute are located within its limits along with numerous other small towns.

District 9

This district is located in southeast Indiana. Suburbs of Cincinnati and Louisville are located within the district. The largest city is Bloomington followed by; Columbus, New Albany, Jeffersonville, and Clarksville.

See also
United States House of Representatives elections, 2006
Indiana's 7th congressional district election, 2006
United States Senate election in Indiana, 2006

References

2006
Indiana
2006 Indiana elections